Morpho hercules, the Hercules morpho, is a Neotropical butterfly found in Brazil and Paraguay.

Description
Upper surface grey green. Forewing with two rows of submarginal yellow dots, of which the proximal are considerably broader than the antemarginal. Patch before the apex of the cell narrow, dark green, subobsolete. Cell black green. Discal area glossy dark green. Distal border broad, deep black. Base of the forewing dark, of the hindwing somewhat lighter sea green.

Under surface: forewing bearing two very large rounded ocelli between the medians and two much smaller ones between the upper radial and the upper median. The proximal median spots narrow, irregular. Discal spot black. Cell with two very broad white longitudinal bands, posteriorly confluent. Hindwing predominantly red brown with a silver-white median band about 3 mm in breadth. There are three anal ocelli with black irises.

Biology
The larva feeds on Musaceae and Menispermaceae (Abuta selloana).

Etymology
It is named for the mythological hero Hercules.

References
Le Moult (E.) & Réal (P.), 1962-1963. Les Morpho d'Amérique du Sud et Centrale, Editions du cabinet entomologique E. Le Moult, Paris.
Paul Smart, 1976 The Illustrated Encyclopedia of the Butterfly World in Color. London, Salamander: Encyclopedie des papillons. Lausanne, Elsevier Sequoia (French language edition)  page 231 fig.3 underside (Brazil)

External links
"Morpho Fabricius, 1807" at Markku Savela's Lepidoptera and Some Other Life Forms with taxonomy and subspecies
Butterflies of America Images of type and other specimens.

hercules
Nymphalidae of South America
Butterflies described in 1823
Fauna of Brazil